Merlynston railway station is located on the Upfield line in Victoria, Australia. It serves the northern Melbourne suburb of Coburg North, and it opened on 8 October 1889 as North Coburg. It closed on 13 July 1903, and reopened on 1 October 1914. On February 6 1922, it was renamed Merlynston.

History

Merlynston station opened on 8 October 1889, when the line was extended from Coburg to Somerton. The station and locality was named by Donald Bain who, in 1919, purchased 31 hectares of land to be subdivided into a estate housing. Bain named the estate after his daughter, Merlyn.

In 1948, flashing light signals were provided at the nearby Boundary Road level crossing, located in the Down direction of the station, with boom barriers provided later on in 1984.

In 1959, the current island platform was provided, when the line was duplicated between Coburg and Fawkner stations.

In November 1998, a level crossing that was located at Shorts Road, south of the station, was closed, and a dead-end street was created on either side of the railway line. Until the track was duplicated to Gowrie in that year, the line north of the station had only a single track, apart from the island platform at Gowrie, which had two platforms. However, one platform was a dock platform, meaning trains couldn't cross at Gowrie, and had to cross at Merlynston.

On 9 April 2002, Comeng motor carriage 533M was destroyed by a fire at the station. The fire also damaged part of the station building.

Platforms and services

Merlynston has one island platform with two faces. It is serviced by Metro Trains' Upfield line services.

Platform 1:
  all stations services to Flinders Street

Platform 2:
  all stations services to Upfield

Transport links

Broadmeadows Bus Service operates two routes via Merlynston station, under contract to Public Transport Victoria:
 : Campbellfield Plaza Shopping Centre – Coburg
 : Upfield station – North Coburg

Dysons operates one route via Merlynston station, under contract to Public Transport Victoria:
 : Glenroy station – Coburg

References

External links
 
 Merlynston - Vicsig
 Melway map at street-directory.com.au

Railway stations in Melbourne
Railway stations in Australia opened in 1889
Railway stations in the City of Merri-bek